George P. Harrington(born 1850) was a member of the Wisconsin State Assembly.

Biography
Harrington was born on March 20, 1850 in Cedarburg, Wisconsin. He attended the University of Wisconsin-Madison and the University of Wisconsin Law School before moving to Milwaukee, Wisconsin in 1876.

Career
Harrington was elected to the Assembly in 1882. Previously, he was Court Commissioner of Milwaukee County, Wisconsin from 1877 to 1882.

References

People from Cedarburg, Wisconsin
Politicians from Milwaukee
University of Wisconsin–Madison alumni
University of Wisconsin Law School alumni
1850 births
Year of death missing
Democratic Party members of the Wisconsin State Assembly